Bay of Gods Mercy is a waterway in the Kivalliq Region, Nunavut, Canada. It is located in Hudson Bay off southwestern Southampton Island. The Boas River empties into the bay.

References

Bays of Kivalliq Region